Albert Hill (8 March 1930 – 14 July 2017) was an English professional footballer who played as a wing-half for Colchester United in the Football League.

Career
Born in West Ham, London, Hill began his career at Chelsea, where he signed a professional contract in May 1950. He failed to break into the first-team, and joined Third Division South club Colchester United on trial in August 1952. He signed permanently for a £300 fee by the end of September 1952. He made his debut on 11 April 1953 in Colchester's 3–1 win against Bristol City. That was to be his only appearance of the season, and over the next four seasons played a role as a squad-player, unable to hold down a regular starting position.

Hill handed in a transfer request at the end of the 1956–57 season in order to find a club closer to his London home. However, his final campaign with the club proved to be his most rewarding making 32 first-team appearances. After making 107 appearances and scoring three goals, he left Colchester in July 1958 to join Dartford. He signed for Hastings United in June 1959, and later played for Canterbury City before knee injuries caused him to end his playing career.

After football
After quitting football, Hill had jobs driving for Schweppes, working for a paper bag manufacturer and later became a London taxicab driver. He died at the age of 87 on 14 July 2017.

Career statistics

References

External links
Bertie Hill Career Stats at Neil Brown's

1930 births
2017 deaths
Footballers from West Ham
English footballers
Association football wing halves
Chelsea F.C. players
Colchester United F.C. players
Dartford F.C. players
Hastings United F.C. (1948) players
Canterbury City F.C. players
English Football League players